Alejandro García may refer to:

 Alejandro García (boxer) (born 1979), Mexican boxer
 Alejandro García (footballer, born 1961), Mexican footballer
 Alejandro García (footballer, born 1984), Spanish footballer
 Alejandro García (soccer, born 1994), American soccer player 
 Alejandro García Caturla (1906–1940), Cuban composer
 Alejandro García Padilla (born 1971), President of the Popular Democratic Party of Puerto Rico
 Alejandro García Reneses (born 1946), Spanish basketball coach
 Álex García (footballer, born 1970), Spanish footballer
 Alejandro Alvarado García (1839–1922), Costa Rican politician
 Alejandro Arturo Garcia (born 1992), Mexican footballer
 Alejandro Robles García (born 1999), Spanish footballer

See also
Alex García (disambiguation)
Alejo García (disambiguation)